Luke Reimer is an Australian rugby union player who plays for the  in Super Rugby. His playing position is flanker. He was named in the Brumbies squad for the 2021 Super Rugby AU season.

Reference list

External links
itsrugby.co.uk profile

Australian rugby union players
Living people
Rugby union flankers
Year of birth missing (living people)
ACT Brumbies players